"The Second Time Around" is an episode of the BBC sitcom, Only Fools and Horses. It was the fourth episode of series 1, and was first broadcast on 29 September 1981. In the episode, an old fiancée of Del's returns and they rekindle their relationship, to Rodney and Grandad's horror.

Synopsis
Del Boy and Rodney are at work as usual, flogging handkerchiefs to the market crowd. They then pop into The Nag's Head for a drink, until Del is surprised to see one of his old girlfriends, Pauline Harris, back in London after twelve years. Pauline tells Del that she got work as an air hostess in San Francisco after her husband Bobby Finch died. Del decides to arrange a date with Pauline so they can be together again, but Rodney does not agree with it, since he remembers Pauline's personality and now suspects that she may be a cold-blooded killer (as it now appears that Finch is one of two husbands to have died).

Later that night, at Nelson Mandela House, as Rodney and Grandad talk about how much trouble Pauline is, Del comes in and announces that he and Pauline are getting married, and that Pauline will be staying with the Trotters.

The next night, Pauline annoys Rodney and Grandad by refusing to cook for both. Del decides that he and Pauline will have to apply for a house of their own.

The next morning, as Rodney and Grandad decide to leave for Auntie Rose's cottage in Clacton, and Pauline goes shopping for her wedding ring, Del gets a phone call from Trigger, who tells him that Bobby Finch died of food poisoning. Del does not believe it at first, but eventually follows Rodney and Grandad before Pauline can kill him.

The Trotters arrive at Auntie Rose's cottage in Clacton and decide to stay for five days. Later that night, while having shepherd's pie for dinner in the living room, Del tells Rodney what he put in his eviction notice to Pauline: "My dearest darling Pauline. The engagement's off, the wedding's off, and as you can gather from this letter, I'm off. I'll give you five clear days to get out of the flat and do not ever come back, you money-grabbing old murderess! All my love, Del Boy." As Rodney wonders what Pauline will do to their flat, Auntie Rose enters the room and asks Del one question: "Who are you?" Del tries to help her remember that she was at Joan and Reg Trotter's wedding in 1947, but it is revealed that the real Auntie Rose had moved many years ago. Nevertheless, the Trotters still stay at the cottage under the pretence of being the adopted children of Joanie Hollins and her Jamaican husband, even though they have no idea who these people are.

A week later, the Trotters return home to their flat to see that Pauline cleaned it and left a letter for Del before she left, informing him that she had dialled the speaking clock in America. Rodney comes clean when he says that it was he and Grandad who put Trigger up to phoning Del, who then forgives his younger brother and grandfather. Grandad goes to answer the phone, and Del and Rodney order him to hang it up, risking a huge telephone bill.

Episode cast

Music
Ronnie Hazlehurst: Original Theme Tune

Note: In the Original Series 1 Broadcasts of Only Fools and Horses, there was a major difference to the theme tune. Ronnie Hazlehurst's theme tune was a jazzy type of instrumental tune that played over the start and end credits. This theme tune was replaced in Series 2 with the more familiar John Sullivan sung theme tune. And after Series 1 completed its first run, all future re-runs of Series 1 dropped Hazlehurst's theme tune and replaced it with the standard John Sullivan version to match all the other series' theme tunes. However, the closing credits still credit Ronnie Hazlehurst as writing the title music. The VHS/DVD versions all contain John Sullivan's version of the theme tune which means Hazlehurst's theme is of an extreme rarity.

External links

1981 British television episodes
Clacton-on-Sea
Only Fools and Horses (series 1) episodes